Lulu Glaser (June 2, 1874 – September 5, 1958) was an American actress and vocalist. She appeared on Broadway and later Vaudeville.

Glaser's first appearance on the stage was at the Broadway Theatre in New York on December 30, 1891 in the play The Lion Tamer. She appeared in two more plays and on October 3, 1893 appeared as Javotte in a revival of Erminie starring Francis Wilson.

Glaser appeared in two motion pictures, both silent films. Love's Pilgrimage to America (1916) and How Molly Made Good (1915). The latter still survives and is available on DVD. Glaser appears as herself, in a cameo along with other celebrities of the time.

She was married twice. Both marriages ended in divorce. She married actor Ralph C. Herz in 1907, but they divorced in 1912. Herz died in 1921. Her later marriage to Thomas D. Richards also ended in divorce. Lulu Glaser is often erroneously said to have been one of the many wives of DeWolf Hopper, but this is not true. Hopper's sixth and last wife was named 'Lillian (Faulkes) Glaser' and is not related to Lulu Glaser.  Lulu, a singer like DeWolf, may have appeared with him on the stage at some point in their long careers.

Glaser died at Weston, Connecticut September 5, 1958.

References

External links

portrait gallery (NY Public Library, Billy Rose collection)

1874 births
1958 deaths
American stage actresses
American silent film actresses
Vaudeville performers
Actresses from Pittsburgh
19th-century American actresses
20th-century American actresses